The fourth edition of the Chihuahua Express was reduced to 2 days because two fatal accidents.

Days

Day 1 Chihuahua-Cd. Madera-Chihuahua
The first day had 9 speed sections. The total distance was 162.79 km. 48 drivers took the start. This stage was marked by the death of Carlos "Chino" García.

Day 2 Chihuahua-Divisadero-Chihuahua
The second day had 12 speed sections. The total distance was 171.43 km. The second day was marked by the death of Hernán Solana, brother of Moises Solana.

References

Chihuahua Express
Chihuahua Express
2010 in Mexican motorsport